These are the full results of the 2014 Asian Indoor Athletics Championships which took place on 15–16 February 2014 in Hangzhou, China.

Men's results

60 meters

Heats – 15 February

Final – 15 February

400 meters

Heats – 15 February

Final – 15 February

800 meters

Heats – 16 February

Final – 16 February

1500 meters
15 February

3000 meters
16 February

60 meters hurdles

Heats – 15 February

Final – 15 February

4 x 400 meters relay
16 February

High jump
16 February

Pole vault
15 February

Long jump
15 February

Triple jump
16 February

Shot put
16 February

Heptathlon
15–16 February

Women's results

60 meters

Heats – 15 February

Final – 15 February

400 meters

Heats – 15 February

Final – 15 February

800 meters
16 February

1500 meters
15 February

3000 meters
16 February

60 meters hurdles
15 February

4 x 400 meters relay
16 February

High jump
16 February

Pole vault
15 February

Long jump
15 February

Triple jump
16 February

Shot put
15 February

Pentathlon
16 February

References

Results 

Asian Indoor Championships Results
Events at the Asian Indoor Athletics Championships